Steven Paul (born May 16, 1959) is an American independent filmmaker, actor, and talent manager. He is the chairman, founder and CEO of Crystal Sky Pictures.

Life and career
Paul was born in New York City. His mother, Dorothy Koster Paul, was a casting director, and his father was in the investment business. He began his career as a child actor at the age of 7, and began writing plays when he was 12. At the age of 21 years old, he was the youngest person to ever direct a major studio film with his directorial debut Falling in Love Again, which he also co-wrote and produced.

Paul's producing credits include Never Too Young to Die, The Musketeer, Ghost Rider, Bratz: The Movie, Doomsday, Tekken, Ghost in the Shell, Rambo: Last Blood, and the Baby Geniuses series. He is also actor Jon Voight's manager, and previously managed Gene Wilder, Michael Cimino, and Bob Clark. He originally set up Paul Entertainment in the early 1980s, teaming up with actress Bo Derek in 1987 to sell the unreleased feature film A Knight of Love.

In 2000, MM Media and Crystal Sky had a 12-picture co-financing deal.

In January 2017, Paul purchased Echo Bridge.

Filmography

Film

Writer/Producer

Producer only

Executive producer

Actor

Television

Writer/Producer

Actor

Personal life
Paul has two siblings, Stuart Paul (an actor and director) and Bonnie Paul (an actress). His niece is actress Skyler Shaye.

References

External links

1959 births
American film directors
American film producers
American male screenwriters
American television producers
American television writers
American talent agents
Living people
American male actors
American independent film production company founders
Film directors from New York City